Video résumé or video resume is a recording promoting a job seeker.

History
Video resumes, sometimes called Visumé or Video CV, were first introduced in the 1980s for use and distribution via VHS tape, but the idea never took off beyond the video taping of interviews. However, with the modern capabilities of transmitting streaming video via the internet, video resumes have taken on new popularity. It is way for job seekers to showcase their abilities beyond the capabilities of a traditional paper résumé. The video resume allows prospective employers to see and hear applicants, and get a feel for how applicants present themselves.

Criticism
With the popularity of video hosting solutions there has been much debate in the usefulness of video resumes. Most recruiters feel that a video alone does not give an employer enough information about a candidate to make a proper evaluation of the applicant's potential and more importantly skills. One article suggests that

"While a video resume introduces applicants on camera, the value such visual imagery adds is debatable. A text resume allows for specific pieces of information to be parsed out and compared across candidates. When the information is delivered verbally, recruiters need to glean the details themselves."

CV presented on a video clip of 3 to 5 minutes can be entertaining as it will show the job-seeker as friendly and sociable person. It can be seen as first part of an interview which is to introduce oneself. It may make it possible to reduce the interview time so that a recruiter may be able to know much more about who the applicant is. At the office interview, a candidate will be silent most of the time and will be in a listening mode. He will have very little time to ask questions and tell fully about himself. When a job-seeker has seen the company's videos and webpages and the recruiter has seen him acting on a video, both parties can arrive at a decision on the first face to face interview. The video presentation may be viewed both as a CV and a remote interview.

Studies have found that there is a gender discrepancy in video resumes as it is often detrimental for women to exhibit 'masculine' workplace characteristics such as assertiveness, confidence and self-promotion, whereas self-promotion was beneficial for male applicants.  There is also an assumption that additional information on age, race, disability, gender and ethnicity provided by video resumes at an early stage in an application process could result in accusations of discrimination. As Hiemstra (2012) states "There is empirical evidence that e-recruitment practices that are perceived as unfair and intrusive lead to negative applicant reactions, possible legal action, and a tendency to 'self-select out'."

See also 
Curriculum vitae

References

External links 
 Job seekers show rather than tell article from USA Today
 Video Resumes: Lights, Camera, Hire Me article from ABC News
 Looking for a job? These startups want you camera ready from The Washington Post
 Is Video Resume the new best thing in Career Enhancement? article from EZJobs

Recruitment
Video